José Carlos Guerra (born 12 September 1994) is a Panamanian football player who plays as goalkeeper for CAI.

International career
Guerra made his debut for the Panama national team in a 0-0 friendly tie with Nicaragua on 26 February 2020.

References

External links
 
 NFT Profile

1994 births
Living people
People from David District
Panamanian footballers
Panama international footballers
Association football goalkeepers
Tauro F.C. players
Liga Panameña de Fútbol players